Westerose is a hamlet in central Alberta, Canada within the County of Wetaskiwin No. 10.

Demographics 
Westerose recorded a population of 63 in the 1991 Census of Population conducted by Statistics Canada.

Education 
Residents of Westerose are assigned to schools in the Wetaskiwin Regional Division No. 11, with Lakedell School serving primary grades and Pigeon Lake Regional School serving secondary grades.

Notable people 
Shirley Anne Cripps, Canadian politician, Progressive Conservative MLA (1979-1989)
Robert Breckon, Unofficial Black Bull Golf Club Champion (1997-2011)

See also 
List of communities in Alberta
List of hamlets in Alberta

References 

Hamlets in Alberta
County of Wetaskiwin No. 10